Muhammet Atalay (born 15 May 1989) is a Turkish former professional cyclist, who currently works as a directeur sportif for UCI Continental team .

Major results

2011
 1st Stage 4 Tour of Trakya
2013
 3rd Time trial, National Road Championships
2015
 3rd Overall Tour of Black Sea
 9th Overall International Tour of Torku Mevlana
2016
 4th Overall Tour of Ankara
2018
 National Road Championships
2nd Road race
2nd Time trial
2019
 3rd GP Sakia El Hamra, Les Challenges de la Marche Verte

References

External links

1989 births
Living people
Turkish male cyclists
Competitors at the 2018 Mediterranean Games
Mediterranean Games competitors for Turkey
20th-century Turkish people
21st-century Turkish people